Hasan Aghareb Parast (1946 – 1984) was an Iranian commander in the Ground Forces of Islamic Republic of Iran Army. He was deputy commander of the 92 armored division and killed in the Iran–Iraq War.

Biography 
Hassan Aghareb Parast was born in Isfahan, Iran in the religious family on 21 April 1946. His father was Mohammad Rahim. He married on 1971 and has four sons.

Education 
Hassan spent his education in Isfahan and achieved high school diploma in 1964. Then he enrolled in exam of Officers' Academy and accepted on 1965. Hassan passed primary course in the Tehran and after that went to Shiraz on 1968. He married on 1971 and on this year went to England for educating Chieftain (tank) course. Two years later went to America and passed chemical warfare period. When returned to Iran, he established chemical and microbial warfare course in Iran for the first time.

In Islamic revolution 
Hassan and Yousef Kolahdouz have revolutionary activities against Mohammad Reza Pahlavi dynasty in the Army. They received statements and cassette of Ruhollah Khomeini and then dispersed between military forces.

In the Iran-Iraq war 
When the Iran-Iraq war started, he went to 92 armored division in the Khorramshar and was deputy commander of the division. Also, he was a candidate for commander of joint staff and defense minister.

Death 
On 17 October 1984, he along with other commanders were killed on Majnoon Island by a mortar bomb.

Bibliography 
 Until the life of love: The biography of military rank martyr Hasan Aghareb Parast Cultural unit of Martyr Foundation (1996)

See also
 List of Iranian commanders in the Iran–Iraq War

References

External links
 Hassan Aghareb Parast official website

1984 deaths
1946 births
Iranian revolutionaries
Military personnel from Isfahan
Islamic Republic of Iran Army personnel of the Iran–Iraq War
Islamic Republic of Iran Army colonels